Sri Vani Vidyashala High School (SVVHS) is a co-educational school in Kalyan, Maharashtra, India. It is one of the schools in Kalyan city at Khadakpada.

History
The South Indian Association of Kalyan started the school in 1947, in the name of Sri Vani Vidyashala, in Tamil medium up to 6th Standard. It was started by like-minded Tamil speaking group under the umbrella of The South Indian Association. It prepares students for the 10th Grade Secondary School Certificate(SSC) examination of Mumbai Divisional Board, Maharashtra State Board of Secondary and Higher Secondary Education. With sustained support from the parents, well wisher and Philanthropist, the Association could succeed in bringing up the institution from a small room measuring 12 ft. x 10 ft. in 1947 to a full-fledged English Medium School in its own four storied Building on a free-hold plot in Rambaug Lane No. 5, Kalyan. In the year 1996–1997, the school facilities were extended in a leased premises of Aadarsh Hindi High School, Rambaug Lane no. 4, Kalyan, where the Pre-Primary section (Nursery, Jr. K. G.  & Sr. K. G.) with a strength of around 628 students and staff strength of about 19 (both teaching & Non-teaching) was functioning till the academic year 2004–2005.  In June 2005, the Pre-Primary Section was shifted to Adarsh Vinodini Mandal School Premises, Rambaug Lane no. 6.

In the Month of May 2015, the school moved from its previous location in Rambaug Lane no. 5, Kalyan to newly constructed, state of the art schooling facility located opp. KDMC “B” ward office, Khadakpada, Kalyan.  The Present students strength is around 3500 & staff strength is 122 (teaching & non-teaching).  Since last 8 years the school is giving 100% result in Std. X.

Sri Vani Vidyashala High School, Khadakpada, Kalyan(W)
The new school built near Cinemax, Khadakpada was inaugurated in May 2015 by Shri Vinod Tawde who is the State minister for primary, higher secondary and technical education, in the presence of Shri Narendra Pawar, MLA - Kalyan(W).

The new four storied building is equipped with modernized classrooms, big auditorium, audio visual, computer lab, state-of-the-art science laboratories which are arguably the best in the district of Thane and many other modern amenities that furnish the ideal environment to educate its students.

New Sri Vani Vidyashala High School
In the year 2002, the Association started another school at Shiv Shakti Complex, Near Patri Pool, Kalyan, by the name of New Sri Vani Vidyashala High School. The present strength of students in this school is around 1200+ and the staff (teaching & non-teaching) strength is 50+.

See also
Kalyan
Khadakpada
List of schools in India
List of schools in Kalyan

External links
Sri Vani Vidyashala High School Facebook Page

Education in Kalyan-Dombivli
Schools in Thane district